The following tables show state-by-state results in the Australian Senate at the 1984 federal election. Senators total 29 coalition (27 Liberal, one coalition National, one CLP), 34 Labor, one Nuclear Disarmament Party, four non-coalition National, seven Democrats, and one Independent. Senator terms are six years (three for territories), and all took their seats immediately due to the expansion of the senate from 64 to 76 members.

As the previous election was a double dissolution, half of the senators elected at that election had their terms backdated to 1 July 1982, to end on 30 June 1988. Senator terms for those contesting this election would have been for 6 year intervals starting from 1 July 1985, but the Double dissolution election of 1987 removed this necessity.

Australia

New South Wales

Victoria

 The Liberals and Nationals contested the previous election as a Coalition in the previous election, and did not do so in this election. The Coalition vote of 1983 of 38.2% was unchanged from the combined Liberal and National vote of this election.

Queensland

Western Australia

South Australia

Tasmania

Australian Capital Territory

Northern Territory

See also

1984 Australian federal election
Candidates of the Australian federal election, 1984
Members of the Australian Senate, 1985–1987

References

External links
Adam Carr's Election Archive

1984 elections in Australia
Senate 1984
Australian Senate elections